Daniel Michael Gakeler (born May 1, 1964) is a former major league baseball pitcher. Although he spent eleven seasons in the minor league organizations of three teams, he would spend just one season on a big league roster for the Detroit Tigers in 1991.

Gakeler attended Rancocas Valley Regional High School in Mount Holly, New Jersey.

References

External links

Baseball Almanac

1964 births
American expatriate baseball players in Canada
Baseball players from New Jersey
Detroit Tigers players
Elmira Pioneers players
Greensboro Hornets players
Indianapolis Indians players
Jacksonville Expos players
Living people
London Tigers players
Lynchburg Red Sox players
Major League Baseball pitchers
New Britain Red Sox players
Pawtucket Red Sox players
People from Mount Holly, New Jersey
Rancocas Valley Regional High School alumni
Sportspeople from Burlington County, New Jersey
Toledo Mud Hens players